The 2020–21 Derde Divisie season was the fifth edition of the Dutch fourth tier, formerly called Topklasse, since the restructuring of the league system in the summer of 2016.

Effects of the 2020 coronavirus pandemic 
In the previous season, on 31 March 2020, the KNVB decided to cancel all competitions at amateur level. They also decided, for those competitions involved, there would be no final standings, and therefore no champions, no promotions and no relegations. As a result, this season starts with most of the same teams as the previous season.

On 7 April 2020, FC Lienden announced the withdrawal of its Sunday team. The club had run into financial problems for some time after Lienden indicated that it would no longer sponsor the team and it was not possible to find a new main sponsor. On 26 May, ONS Sneek was granted a voluntary demotion to the Hoofdklasse for financial reasons. Also, the two remaining reserve teams, Jong ADO and Jong Almere City, or any other reserves, could no longer play in the Derde Divisie from this season on. In accordance with the decision from KNVB's meeting on 16 December 2019, these two teams are playing in the new under-21 competition.

Later on 12 June, the KNVB officially announced that the Derde Divisie would again consist of 36 teams from next season. This was one wish of CVTD, the interest group of football clubs from the Tweede and Derde Divisies. To fill vacancies and accommodate all teams that led their groups in the Hoofdklasse after the cancellation, the KNVB decided to make each Derde Divisie group have 18 teams. The Hoofdklasse group leaders, namely Sportlust '46, Staphorst, Unitas and Hollandia, therefore moved up to the Derde Divisie. The best runners-up of the Saturday and Sunday Hoofdklasse, Asser Christelijke Voetbalvereniging (ACV) and JOS Watergraafsmeer, were also promoted.

On 24 February 2021, the KNVB eventually discontinued category A senior competitions in this season, including Derde Divisie, again without promotion or relegation.

Saturday league

Teams 

>> Competition cancelled, what's listed below is the situation on 10 October 2020, the date the last matches were played.<<

Standings

Fixtures/results

Sunday league

Teams 

>> Competition cancelled, what's listed below is the situation on 11 October 2020, the date the last matches were played.<<

Standings

Fixtures/results

References 

Derde Divisie seasons
Derde Divisie
Netherlands
Netherlands